The Arkansas–Monticello Boll Weevils and Cotton Blossoms are composed of 10 teams representing the University of Arkansas at Monticello in intercollegiate athletics, including men and women's basketball, cross country, and golf. Men's sports include baseball and football. Women's sports include volleyball and softball. The Boll Weevils and Cotton Blossoms compete in the NCAA Division II and are members of the Great American Conference.

Teams

Baseball

Arkansas–Monticello has had 5 Major League Baseball Draft selections since the draft began in 1965.

Football

Current head coaches (as of August 25, 2021)

Rivals

Battle of the Timberlands

The Battle of the Timberlands is an annual football game between University of Arkansas-Monticello and Southern Arkansas University. The game became known as the "Battle of the Timberlands" in 2012 when a traveling trophy for the contest was created. The rivalry between the two schools dates back to 1913. Both schools are currently members of the Great American Conference. Through the 88 games played, SAU leads the series 52–36–1. UAM won most recently on November 10, 2018 by a score of 20–17.

References

External links